The Luxembourg Synagogue is a Jewish synagogue in Luxembourg City, Luxembourg.

History

The first synagogue 
The first synagogue in Luxembourg City was founded in 1823 on Rue du Petit-Séminaire (today Rue de la Congrégation). Samuel Hirsch served as the first Chief Rabbi in 1843. The synagogue left this location in 1891 and was replaced by Congrégation de Notre-Dame. A memorial for the deportation of Jews was installed at this location on June 17, 2018.

The second synagogue 

In 1894 a new synagogue was built at the corner of Rue Notre-Dame and Rue Aldringen. It was designed by German architects Ludwig Levy and Charles Arendt who also oversaw construction. The synagogue was built in a Moorish Revival style similar to the Great Synagogue of Florence. It had room for 300 people: 150 for male worshippers, 120 for female worshippers and 30 seats for the chorus and schoolchildren. It was opened on September 28, 1894 by Chief Rabbi Isaac Blumenstein and members of the government and communal council. In May 1941, the synagogue was desecrated by the Gestapo and was progressively demolished until 1943, when it became difficult to find a company willing to do the work.

The third synagogue 
Plans for a third synagogue were prepared by architects Victor Engels and René Mailliet. The windows of the synagogue were designed by Frantz Kinnen.

Construction began on June 12, 1951 on Avenue Monterey. The synagogue was consecrated on June 28, 1953 by Chief Rabbi Charles Lehrmann in the presence of Grand Duke Jean.

In November 2018, a commemorative plaque was placed at the location of the destroyed synagogue on Rue Notre-Dame.

References

See also 

 The Holocaust in Luxembourg

Bibliography 

 
 Laurent Moyse & Marc Schoentgen (éditeurs), 2001. La présence juive au Luxembourg du Moyen Âge au XXe siècle. Erausgi vu B'nai B'rith Luxembourg. 114 S.
 Laurent Moyse: Introduction. S. 7–9.
 Jean-Marie Yante: Heurs et malheurs des établissements juifs dans le Luxembourg (XIIIe siècle-début XVIe siècle). S. 11–20.
 Joseph Goedert: L'émancipation de la communauté israélite luxembourgeoise et l'administration du culte dans la première moitié du 19e siècle (1801-1855). S. 21–56. (Nodrock aus Galerie 3 vun 1993, S. 345–384.
 Lucien Blau: Antisémitisme au Grand-Duché de Luxembourg de la fin du XIXe siècle à 1940. S. 57–70.
 Paul Cerf: L'attitude de la population luxembourgeoise à l'égard des Juifs pendant l'occupation allemande, S. 71–74.
 Marc Schoentgen: Die Jüdische Gemeinde Luxemburgs 1945-1960. Rekonstruktion und Integration. S. 75-104.
 Georges Hellinghausen: Le dialogue judéo-chrétien de l'après-guerre et ses perspectives au Luxembourg. S. 105–112.
 Notices biographiques, S. 113-114: Lucien Blau - Paul Cerf - Joseph Goedert - Georges Hellinghausen - Laurent Moyse - Marc Schoentgen - Jean-Marie Yante.
 .

Ashkenazi Jewish culture in Europe
Ashkenazi synagogues
Holocaust commemoration
Synagogues destroyed by Nazi Germany
Orthodox Judaism in Europe
Orthodox synagogues
Synagogues in Europe
Religious buildings and structures in Luxembourg City
Jews and Judaism in Luxembourg
Religious buildings and structures completed in 1953